Song Kyung-ho (born June 30, 1995), better known as Smeb, is a South Korean former professional League of Legends player.

Career 
Song began competing in League of Legends in 2012. He joined the Tigers in 2014, upon the team's formation. Smeb got his first penta kill recorder of top solo laner; on June 13, 2015, he achieved his penta kill by playing Riven against Jin Air Greenwings. KOO Tigers finished second at the 2015 League of Legends World Championship.

He was named MVP of the 2016 LCK season. Before the beginning of the 2016 League of Legends World Championship, he was ranked the No. 1 player in the world by the Worlds analysts and the No. 2 player in the world by ESPN. Despite, his performance, the ROX Tigers lost 3–2 to SKT T1 on the semifinals.

Smeb was the sixth player to achieve 1,000 kills of LCK overall after Faker, Pray, Bang, Score and Kuro. He achieved 1,000 kills in the second round against KONGDOO MONSTER on March 1, 2018, during League of Legends Champions Korea 2018 Spring Season. He was selected as a 2018 PyeongChang Olympic torch relay runner along with the kt Rolster members.

On December 17, 2020, he announced his retirement from professional League of Legends.

Tournament results

Individual awards 
 2016 — League of Legends Champions Korea Spring Regular Season MVP
 2016 — League of Legends Champions Korea Summer Regular Season MVP
 2016 — Korea e-Sports Association League of Legends Popularity Award

References

External links 
 

1995 births
Living people
South Korean esports players
League of Legends top lane players
KT Rolster players
Place of birth missing (living people)